Virgin Radio UK is a national Hot Adult Contemporary radio station in the United Kingdom that launched on 30 March 2016, owned by Wireless Group which is itself a subsidiary of News Corp. It is the second incarnation of Virgin Radio in the UK: the original station launched in 1993 before being rebranded as Absolute Radio in 2008.

As of December 2022, the station has a weekly audience of 1.3 million listeners according to RAJAR.

History
The station launched at 11:00 on 30 March 2016 on a Virgin Trains service from Manchester to London by Edith Bowman and Matt Richardson and the first song played was a live cover version of David Bowie's song "Changes" by Gavin James.

At launch, Virgin Radio UK broadcast to about 75% of the UK population via the Sound Digital DAB ensemble, and also broadcasts via online streaming to computers, mobile device applications and internet radios. It cannot be received outside of the UK.

The broadcasts are presented live from 04:00 to 01:00, and then music is played back-to-back overnight with pre-recorded announcements from rotating presenters from the day.

On 3 September 2018, Chris Evans announced that from January 2019 he would be moving to Virgin Radio after 13 years of broadcasting on BBC Radio 2. He launched his new breakfast show on 21 January 2019.

On 7 January 2019, Virgin Radio joined the Sky and Freesat satellite platforms.

In January 2021 Graham Norton started a weekend show after 10 years at Radio 2.  As with Chris Evans' show, it is distinguished by not having advertisements due to being wholly sponsored.

Sister stations

Wireless launched two new Virgin-branded DAB+ spin-off stations on 21 December 2018. Virgin Radio Anthems plays guitar-based classics from the 1980s and 1990s. Virgin Radio Chilled features acoustic singer-songwriters and is designed to unwind and relax. Both stations broadcast The Chris Evans Breakfast Show. When Virgin Anthems launched in December 2018, the station changed its slogan to "The Chris Evans Breakfast Show and Classic Tracks".

On 30 December 2019, Virgin Radio UK launched a third digital spin-off stationVirgin Radio Grooveon DAB+. It consists of motown, soul and disco music and broadcasts The Chris Evans Breakfast Show at breakfast.

In June 2021 a temporary station launched for the LGBTQ+ community, Virgin Radio Pride; It featured many different programmes and documentaries presented by a wide variety of presenters. Virgin Radio Pride returned for a second run during summer 2022.

On 1 September 2022, the sister station Virgin Radio 80s Plus was launched, which play the artists from the 1980s, plus the best music from the late 1970s and early 1990s. Virgin Radio 80s Plus can be heard online, on smart speakers across the UK and on DAB in Greater London and the Central Belt of Scotland. It replaces Virgin Radio Pride on DAB radio.

Notable presenters

Current presenters

 Bam
 Vicki Blight
 Tim Cocker
 Chris Evans
 Ben Jones
 Maria McErlane
 Stu Elmore
 James Merritt
 Nick Jackson

 Jayne Middlemiss
 Graham Norton
 Eddy Temple-Morris
 Amy Voce
 Steve Denyer
 Sean Goldsmith
 Olivia Jones
 Rich Williams
 Ricky Wilson

Former presenters

 Edith Bowman 
 Jon Holmes
 Iain Lee
 Russell Kane
 Angela Scanlon
 Inel Tomlinson
 Matt Richardson
 Jamie East

 Pete Mitchell
 Scott Hughes
 Debbie Mac
 Chris Brooks
 Kate Lawler
 Sam Pinkham
 Christian Williams
 Gaby Roslin
 Robin Banks

External links

References

Radio stations established in 2016
Virgin Radio
Wireless Group
2016 establishments in the United Kingdom